Seplat Petroleum Development Company (SEPLAT) is a Nigerian independent oil and gas company listed on both the London and Nigerian Stock Exchanges with assets in the Niger Delta.

History
SEPLAT was formed in June 2009 through the partnership of Shebah Petroleum Development Company Limited and Platform Petroleum Joint Ventures Limited to specifically pursue upstream oil and gas opportunities in Nigeria, and in particular divestment opportunities arising out of the incumbent Major IOC's portfolios.

In July 2010, SEPLAT acquired a 45 percent interest in, and was appointed operator of, three onshore producing oil and gas blocks in the Niger Delta (OMLs 4, 38 and 41). In June 2013, SEPLAT acquired an interest in the Umuseti/Igbuku marginal field area within OPL 283 and in February 2015 acquired interests in OML 53 and OML 55.

Alongside its oil business, the company has also developed its gas reserves.

On February 8, 2015, it was announced that Seplat had purchased stakes in two onshore Nigeria blocks from Chevron Nigeria for a combined $391.6 million.

Seplat was working toward a purchase of ExxonMobil Nigeria's offshore shallow-water assets for $1.3 billion to $1.6 billion in August 2022, pending regulatory hurdles.

References 

Oil and gas companies of Nigeria